No Guts No Glory may refer to:

No Guts...No Glory (Molly Hatchet album) (1983)
No Guts No Glory!!, an album by Sunspot Jonz (2005)
No Guts. No Glory., an album by Airbourne (2010)
No Guts No Glory (Phyno album) (2014)
No Guts, No Glory (Moe album) (2014)
"No Guts, No Glory", theme song of The Adventures of the Galaxy Rangers
"No Guts, No Glory", song by Bolt Thrower from Mercenary
No Guts, No Glory, a song by Ran-D featuring Skits Vicious
Adolf H. Lundin: No Guts No Glory, a biography about Adolf H. Lundin by Robert Eriksson (2003)